Below is list of Latvian language exonyms for places in non-Latvian-speaking places:

Albania

Austria

Belarus

Belgium

Denmark

Estonia

France

Germany

Greece

Italy

Lithuania

Portugal

Romania

Russia

Serbia

Switzerland

See also

List of European exonyms
Names of Lithuanian places in other languages

Latvian
Exonyms